This is a list of concert tours of Taiwanese singer-songwriter Jay Chou.

Fantasy Tour (2001–2002)

The One World Tour (2002–2004)

Incomparable World Tour (2004–2006)

The World Tour (2007–2009)

The Era World Tour (2010–2011)

Opus Jay World Tour (2013–2015)

The Invincible World Tour (2016–2018)

The Carnival World Tour (2019–present)

References

External links
Jay Chou at JVR Music 

World Tours
Lists of concert tours